Gordo was one of the first monkeys to travel into space. As part of the NASA space program, Gordo, also known as Old Reliable, was launched from Cape Canaveral on December 13, 1958, in the U.S. PGM-19 Jupiter rocket on its AM-13 mission. The rocket would travel over 1,500 miles and reach a height of 310 miles (500 km) before returning to Earth and landing in the South Atlantic. A technical malfunction prevented the capsule's parachute from opening and, despite a short search, neither his body nor the vessel were ever recovered.

Background

Gordo was a South American species of squirrel monkey, about one foot tall and weighing between 1 and 1.5 kg. He was chosen for space travel because of his species' similar anatomical makeup to man and sensitivity to changes in temperature. Missions using monkeys in space were not new: four monkeys called Albert, as well as monkeys called Patricia and Mike had all flown by 1962.

The flight

The flight took place at 0353 hours EST when the Jupiter AM-13 rocket containing Gordo was launched from the Atlantic Missile Range at Cape Canaveral. The rocket ascended to a height of 290 miles while travelling 1300 lateral miles. Scientists monitoring the flight found that, aside from a slight slowing of the pulse, Gordo suffered no ill effects from the entry into space or resultant weightlessness. Gordo wore a specially customized space suit and was fitted with instruments, including a thermometer and microphone, to monitor his health.

In total the flight lasted 15 minutes, of which Gordo was weightless for 8.3 minutes, as the craft exited and re-entered Earth's atmosphere at a speed of over 10,000 miles per hour. The failure of Gordo's parachute meant that both he and the capsule were lost, despite efforts to recover them. It is believed that Gordo was alive at the time of impact.

Legacy

Despite the loss of Gordo, the mission was considered a success by NASA. It had gone some way towards alleviating the concerns over how the human body would cope with weightlessness and the difficulties of space travel. Less than a year later, Gordo was followed into space by the monkeys Able and Baker who survived a similar launch profile. Despite these advances, though, it would be the Russian Yuri Gagarin who would become the first human in space.

See also
Monkeys in space
List of individual monkeys

References

External links
BBC News article
Details of the Jupiter IRBM Missions
SpaceToday.org
One Small Step: The Story of the Space Chimps Official Documentary Site

Animals in space
Individual monkeys
Space program fatalities
1958 animal deaths
Animal rights
Animal testing in the United States
Animal cruelty incidents
Non-human primate astronauts of the American space program